Kim Kwang-hyok (born 27 August 1985) is a North Korean international football striker, playing club football for Kyŏnggong'ŏp in the DPR Korea Premier Football League since 2013.

Goals for Senior National Team

References

External links

 Kim Kwang-hyok at DPRKFootball

1985 births
Living people
North Korean footballers
North Korea international footballers
April 25 Sports Club players
Association football forwards